Lioness is the self-titled EP and first release from Canadian indie rock band Lioness. It was released on October 21, 2008 in Canada by New Romantic Music.

Track listing

Personnel
Vanessa Fischer – vocals
Ronnie Morris – bass
Jeff Scheven – drums, electronica

2008 EPs
Lioness (band) albums